The 1970 NFL season was the 51st regular season of the National Football League, and the first one after the consummation of the AFL–NFL merger. The merged league realigned into two conferences: all 10 of the former AFL teams joined the Baltimore Colts, Cleveland Browns, and Pittsburgh Steelers to form the American Football Conference; while the other 13 NFL clubs formed the National Football Conference. The season concluded with Super Bowl V when the Baltimore Colts beat the Dallas Cowboys  at the Orange Bowl in Miami, Florida. The Pro Bowl took place on January 24, 1971, where the NFC beat the AFC  at the Los Angeles Memorial Coliseum.

Merger between NFL and AFL 

The merger forced a realignment between the combined league's clubs. During the previous 1969 season, there were 16 NFL teams and 10 AFL teams:

Because there were more NFL teams than AFL teams, three teams needed to be transferred to balance the two new conferences at 13 teams each. In May 1969, the Baltimore Colts, Cleveland Browns, and the Pittsburgh Steelers agreed to join all ten AFL teams to form the American Football Conference (AFC). The remaining NFL teams formed the National Football Conference (NFC).

Replacing the old Eastern and Western conferences (although divisions from those conferences still existed but were renamed to suit the realignment), the new conferences, AFC and NFC, function similar to Major League Baseball's American and National leagues, and each of those two were divided into three divisions: East, Central, and West. The two Eastern divisions had five teams; the other four divisions had four teams each. The realignment discussions for the NFC were so contentious that one final plan, out of five of them, was selected from an envelope in a vase by Commissioner Pete Rozelle's secretary, Thelma Elkjer on January 16, 1970.

The format agreed on was as follows:

This arrangement would keep most of the pre-merger NFL teams in the NFC and the AFL teams in the AFC. Pittsburgh, Cleveland, and Baltimore were placed in the AFC in order to balance the conferences, while the NFC equalized the competitive strength of its East and West divisions rather than sorting out teams purely geographically.

Division alignment in 1970 largely kept traditional rivals in the same division. Plans were also made to add two expansion teams, but this would not take place until 1976, seven years after the merger, when the Tampa Bay Buccaneers and Seattle Seahawks joined the league.

The 26-team league also began to use an eight-team playoff format, four from each conference, that included the three division winners and a wild card team, the second-place team with the best record.

Draft
The 1970 NFL Draft was held from January 27 to 28, 1970 at New York City's Belmont Plaza Hotel. With the first pick, the Pittsburgh Steelers selected quarterback Terry Bradshaw from Louisiana Tech University.

Major rule changes

The NFL rules became the standardized rules for the merged league, with two exceptions that were both carried over from the AFL:
The stadium's scoreboard clock became the official game clock. An official (the line judge beginning in 1965) kept the official time on the field in the NFL; however, the scoreboard clock was the official timepiece for the four Super Bowls contested prior to the merger. 
The practice of having the players' last names added to the backs of their jerseys became universal. The old NFL teams did not have names on the back prior to this season, whereas the AFL teams did.

After experimenting with compromise rules regarding the two-point conversion (then exclusive to the AFL) during the late 1960s preseasons, the NFL decided not to use that feature and use its previous rule only allowing one point for any conversion. The two-point conversion would later be added to the NFL rules in 1994.

Division races
Starting in 1970, there were three divisions (Eastern, Central and Western) in each conference. The winners of each division, and a fourth "wild card" team based on the best non-division winner, qualified for the playoffs. The tiebreaker rules were changed to start with head-to-head competition, followed by intra-conference records and finally a coin flip. This became problematic during the final week of the regular season when potential victories by the Cowboys, Lions and Giants would have resulted in all three teams having similar records, New York winning the NFC East championship and a coin toss between Dallas and Detroit to decide the wild card. That possibility was averted when the Giants were the only team of the three to lose. Because of this close call regarding possible use of coin toss, future tie-breakers would be expanded to have more competitive aspects.

National Football Conference

American Football Conference

Final standings

Tiebreakers
Green Bay finished ahead of Chicago in the NFC Central based on better division record (2–4 to Bears' 1–5).

Playoffs

Records 
On November 8, New Orleans Saints placekicker Tom Dempsey kicked a record 63-yard field goal as time expired to win 19–17 over the visiting Detroit Lions. His record 64-yard field goal was at elevation in Denver on December 8, at the end of the first half. That record would stand until September 26, 2021, when Baltimore Ravens' Justin Tucker kicked a 66 yard field goal as time expired to win 19-17 over the Detroit Lions

The Denver Broncos, Detroit Lions, and Los Angeles Rams all started 3–0 but lost in Week Four. Only the Lions advanced to the postseason after the 3–0 start.

Coaching changes

Offseason
Baltimore Colts: Don McCafferty replaced Don Shula, who left the team to coach the Miami Dolphins.
Miami Dolphins: Don Shula left the Baltimore Colts to replace the fired George Wilson as Miami's head coach.
San Diego Chargers: Charlie Waller began his first full season as head coach. He replaced Sid Gillman to serve for five games in 1969 due to Gillman's poor health.
Washington Redskins: Vince Lombardi was diagnosed with terminal cancer in late June and died on September 3. Offensive line coach Bill Austin served as Washington's head coach for the 1970 season.

In-season
Boston Patriots: Clive Rush resigned after seven games into the season due to medical reasons. John Mazur served as interim for the rest of the season and was hired as the full-time coach for 1971.
New Orleans Saints: Tom Fears was fired after a 1–5–1 start. J. D. Roberts was named as his replacement and was hired as the full-time coach for 1971.

Stadium changes 
Before the season, the league had demanded that the Chicago Bears find a new home field: Wrigley Field was too small, as it did not meet the new stadium requirement to seat at least 50,000, and it did not have lights installed (and would not install them until 1988), meaning it was unavailable for late afternoon and night games. The Chicago Cubs baseball team, which shared the stadium with the Bears, did not want to convert it to a football configuration while the Cubs were still in playoff contention.

As a result, the Chicago Bears' first home game of the season against the Philadelphia Eagles was played at Northwestern University's Dyche Stadium. The Bears also treated this game as a trial run for possibly moving their home games to Evanston. Dyche Stadium (since renamed Ryan Field), also did not have lights at the time (nor does it have permanent standards today), was it was still planned to make the Bears' new home. But a deal fell through due to strong opposition from several athletic directors in the Big Ten Conference and residents of Evanston. After negotiations with the Cubs' ownership for continued use of Wrigley Field collapsed, the Bears moved to Soldier Field in 1971 where they remain to the present day, save for a temporary relocation in 2002 to the University of Illinois' Memorial Stadium while Soldier Field was completely renovated.

The Boston Patriots played in their fourth different facility in 11 seasons, leaving Alumni Stadium at Boston College for Harvard Stadium, the only facility in Massachusetts at that time which met the NFL's 50,000-seat minimum. The struggles to find a home led the Patriots to hastily construct Schaeffer Stadium in Foxborough, which opened in 1971. The Patriots, who were renamed from "Boston" to "New England" when they moved, continue to play in Foxborough in Gillette Stadium, which opened in 2002.

Two multi-purpose stadiums made their debut this season: Riverfront Stadium and Three Rivers Stadium, replacing Nippert Stadium and Pitt Stadium as the homes of the Cincinnati Bengals and Pittsburgh Steelers, respectively. 1970 was also the last season in which Franklin Field was the home of the Eagles; they would move to Veterans Stadium, another multi-purpose stadium, for the 1971 season.

Seven teams played their home games on artificial turf in 1970. This was up from 2 teams in both the NFL and AFL in 1969. The teams were: Cincinnati, Dallas, Miami,  Pittsburgh and St. Louis, who joined Houston and Philadelphia, the two teams which played on turf in 1969. Super Bowl V was held at the Orange Bowl in Miami, and was the first Super Bowl played on artificial turf (specifically, Poly-Turf).

Uniform changes
 The Dallas Cowboys moved the TV numbers on their jerseys from the shoulders to the sleeves. They remained on the sleeves of the white jersey through 1973 and the blue jersey through 1978. 
 The Detroit Lions added trim to their helmet logo beginning in week five. 
 The Minnesota Vikings added an alternate purple jersey with no sleeve striping, worn for warm-weather games. 
 The Oakland Raiders used silver numbers instead of black on their white jerseys for the first time since 1963
 The Pittsburgh Steelers wore white pants with their white jerseys, the first time they wore white pants since wearing them for all games in 1965. 
 The Philadelphia Eagles wore white helmets at all their games, discontinuing their practice of using green helmets with their white jerseys and white helmets with their green jerseys
 The Washington Redskins switched from burgundy to gold helmets, and from the arrow helmet logo to a new logo featuring an "R" inside a circle with Native American feathers hanging down from the side

Television changes 
To televise their games, the combined league retained the services of CBS and NBC, who were previously the primary broadcasters of the NFL and the AFL, respectively. It was then decided that CBS would televise all NFC teams (including playoff games) while NBC all AFC teams. For interconference games, CBS would broadcast them if the visiting team was from the NFC and NBC would carry them when the visitors were from the AFC. At the time, all NFL games were blacked out in the home team's market, so this arrangement meant that fans in each team's home market would see all of their team's televised Sunday afternoon games on the same network (CBS for NFC teams and NBC for AFC teams).  The two networks also divided up the Super Bowl on a yearly rotation, with the network of the designated visiting conference (NBC for odd-numbered games, CBS for even-numbered game) televising each game through Super Bowl XVIII.  From 1970–73, whichever network did not televise the Super Bowl televised the Pro Bowl the next week.

Meanwhile, with the debut of Monday Night Football on ABC on September 21, 1970, the league became the first professional sports league in the United States to have a regular series of nationally televised games in prime-time, and the only league ever to have its games televised on all of the then-three major broadcast networks at the same time.  Both teams that advanced to the Super Bowl, the Baltimore Colts and the Dallas Cowboys, had suffered humiliating defeats at home on Monday Night Football during the season.

All three networks initially signed four-year television contracts through the 1973 season. The first MNF team consisted of veteran play-by-play announcer Keith Jackson, sportscaster Howard Cosell, and former Dallas Cowboys quarterback Don Meredith. Ray Scott remained as lead play-by-play announcer for CBS, but Pat Summerall replaced Paul Christman as that network's lead color commentator after Christman died from a heart attack on March 2, 1970. Curt Gowdy and Kyle Rote remained as NBC's lead broadcast team.

References
NFL Record and Fact Book
NFL History 1961–1970 (Last accessed December 4, 2005)
Total Football: The Official Encyclopedia of the National Football League

National Football League
1970